Human Emotions is an album released by country musician David Allan Coe. It was released in 1978 on Columbia.

Recording
The original vinyl release of Human Emotions is divided into two parts, Happy Side and Su-I-Side (with side one filled with songs composed by Coe – and some recorded – before another wife left him) and side two focusing on the aftermath, with the tunes connected by the sound of beach waves.  The album features Billy Sherrill's debut as Coe's producer, with Thom Jurek noting in his AllMusic review of the album:

In keeping with the theme, side one offers brighter cuts, such as the promising new love of “If This Is Just a Game,” which boasted a commercial sound that became a minor hit for Coe, reaching #45, his highest charting single since “Willie, Waylon, and Me” hit #25 in 1976. “Mississippi River Queen” is a travelogue of outlaw machismo cut from the same cloth as the Waylon Jennings “I'm a Ramblin’ Man." The catchy “You Can Count on Me” is a song of utter devotion, while the optimistic “Tomorrow Is Another Day” returns to the Jimmy Buffett sound Coe had mined on his previous song “Divers Do It Deeper.”  Side two, the Su-I-Side collection, begins with what AllMusic calls “a masterpiece, with its syncopated vocal lead lines, country-waltz tempo, and huge backing chorus.”  From there, the story descends into a cheating, drunken abyss.  “She Finally Crossed Over (Love's Cheating Line)” is a bitter study in self-pity and betrayal (“My best friend loved her right out of my mind...”) and the down-and-out barroom anthem “Jack Daniels, If You Please” would become of Coe's more popular songs.  Another drinking song, “Whiskey and Women,” features Janie Frickie on background vocals. The album closes with the southern rock boogie of “Suicide,” its riotous groove at odds with the foreboding lyrics.

Reception
Human Emotions peaked at #45 on the country albums chart.  AllMusic calls it "one of Coe's better efforts in the 1970s.”

Track listing
All Songs written by David Allan Coe.

Happy Side
"Would You Lay with Me (In a Field of Stone)" – 2:54
"If This Is Just a Game" – 3:29
"You Can Count on Me" – 2:40
"Mississippi River Queen" – 2:32
"Tomorrow Is Another Day" – 2:42

Su-I-Side
"Human Emotions" – 4:28
"(She Finally Crossed Over) Love's Cheating Line" – 4:07
"Whiskey and Women" – 2:34
"Jack Daniels If You Please" – 3:17
"Suicide" – 3:37

Personnel
 David Allan Coe, The Nashville Edition, Janie Fricke, Pam Rose, Billy Sherrill – vocals
 Tommy Allsup, Reggie Young, Jimmy Capps, Phil Baugh, Wesley Taylor – guitar
 Lloyd Green, Pete Drake, Dale Seigfreid – steel guitar
 Henry Strzelecki, Ron Bledsoe, Alan Hicks – bass
 Kenny Malone, Jerry Carrigan, James Isbell – drums
 Hargus "Pig" Robbins – piano
 Farrell Morris – percussion
 Billy Sherrill – producer

References

David Allan Coe albums
1978 albums
Albums produced by Billy Sherrill
Columbia Records albums